"Make You Sweat" is the title of a number-one R&B single by Keith Sweat.   As the leading single from the album, I'll Give All My Love to You, the hit song reached number fourteen on the Billboard Hot 100 and spent one week at number-one on the US R&B chart.  "Make You Sweat" also peaked at number five on the dance charts.

The title of the song became the title of Keith Sweat's greatest hits album 14 years later.

Track listing
A1. Make You Sweat (Edit of LP Version) (3:47)
A2. Make You Sweat (Extended Version) (6:02)
B1. Make You Sweat (Sweat Beat) (1:18)
B2. Make You Sweat (Club Beat) (5:07)
B3. Make You Sweat (Instrumental) (5:46)

Charts

Peak positions

End of year charts

See also
 R&B number-one hits of 1990 (USA)

References

Keith Sweat songs
1990 singles
1990 songs
Elektra Records singles
Songs written by Keith Sweat
Songs written by Timmy Gatling